Étienne Philippe Martin (27 July 1856, Marseille - 6 March 1945, Marseille) was a French painter, composer and writer.

Biography 
His father, was a watercolorist. He began as a pianist, but suffered from hand cramps and switched to composing instead. Gradually, he turned to painting, taking lessons from his father, then studying oil painting with Antoine Vollon, who had a permanent influence on his style. Later, he would write Vollon's biography.

He participated in the Paris Salon from 1876 to 1932, receiving an honorable mention in 1885. He was awarded a silver medal at the Exposition Universelle (1889).

In 1903, he was elected a member of the Académie de Marseille. He was also Chairman of the museum's Board of Directors from 1906 to 1912. From 1912 to 1916, and again from 1920 to 1923, he was President of the Association des Artistes Marseillais.

He was the author of several works in addition to Vollon's biography; notably Réflexion d'un artiste sur la science, where he explores his feelings about progress and science. Many of his works have a nostalgic tone.

References

Further reading 
 Jean Chélini, Félix Reynaud, Madeleine Villard; Dictionnaire des marseillais, Académie de Marseille, 2001 
 Jean-Roger Soubiran and Nadine Gomz-Passamar; L'utopie d'une Provence éternelle: L'œuvre des Martin, Fage éditions, 2005 
 André Alauzen and Laurent Noet; Dictionnaire des peintres et sculpteurs de Provence-Alpes-Côte d'Azur, Jeanne Laffitte, 2006

External links 

More works by Martin @ ArtNet

1856 births
1945 deaths
19th-century French painters
French landscape painters
French non-fiction writers
French curators
Artists from Marseille
20th-century French painters